Iroponera (from Latin ironia, "assumed ignorance", -pone, from the name of the subfamily) is a monotypic genus of ants in the subfamily Ponerinae. Iroponera odax, the single described species, is known only from a few collections in Australia (including Tasmania).

Workers are orange-colored and small in size (2.6 mm). Queens and males remain unknown. Little is known about their biology, but their small eyes indicate a subterranean lifestyle.

References

Ponerinae
Monotypic ant genera
Hymenoptera of Australia